Lamar Academy is an alternative education school in McAllen, Texas. A part of the McAllen Independent School District, it includes an International Baccalaureate program and Options in Education High School. It is available to any student whose home school is either McAllen Memorial High School, McAllen High School, or James "Nikki" Rowe High School

Further reading
Bland, Jennifer A. and Katrina R. Woodworth. "Case Studies of Participation and Performance in the IB Diploma Programme." Center for Educational Policy, SRI International. 2009. - Discusses the IB program at Lamar Academy

References

External links
 Lamar Academy - McAllen ISD

Education in McAllen, Texas
International Baccalaureate schools in Texas
McAllen Independent School District high schools
Buildings and structures in McAllen, Texas
Schools in Hidalgo County, Texas
2001 establishments in Texas